R Pictoris is a semiregular variable type star in the constellation Pictor. It ranges between apparent magnitude 5.1 and 14.4, and spectral types M1IIe to M4IIe, over a period of 168 days.

References 

Durchmusterung objects
030551
022170
Pictoris, R
Pictor (constellation)
M-type giants
Semiregular variable stars